Lorenzo Quaglio the Younger (19 December 1793 – 15 March 1869) was a genre painter and lithographer, born in Munich to the long Italian pedigree of Quaglios.

Life
Quaglio studied under his father Joseph Quaglio and his brother Angelo Quaglio. He then went on to study at the Akademie München. He spent a few years, until 1812, working as a decorator of the court and national theaters in Munich. He spent time traveling through the Bavarian and Tirolian Alps. In 1812 his first lithography appeared, a study of nature. In 1820 he made a study of Bavarian folk costume. After 1834 he worked in Schloss Hohenschwangau.

He died in Munich and is buried in the southern cemetery.

Works
Quaglio created the following works:
 Im Dorf Kochel 1848
 Bauernbursche, am Eibsee bey Garmisch 1830
 Sennbube von der Hochalpe bey Garmisch 1830
 Hüterbub mit Krax´n, bey Garmisch 1830
 Die Alpe Hammersbach mit dem Waxenstein bey Garmisch 1830
 Buckelwiesen in Krün bey Partenkirchen 1830
 Alm am Eibsee bey Grainau 1831
 Lermos in Tyrol 1837
 Wirtin in Lermoos 1839
 Auf dem Weg nach Mittenwald 1839
 View of Frankfurt 1831 at Städel Gallery in Frankfurt

Campe wrote of him in 1833 the following:

References

External links

1793 births
1869 deaths
19th-century German painters
19th-century Italian male artists
German male painters
German genre painters
19th-century Italian painters
Italian male painters
Academy of Fine Arts, Munich alumni
People from Garmisch-Partenkirchen (district)